Tetsuya Mizumoto is an engineer from the Tokyo Institute of Technology, Japan. He was named a Fellow of the Institute of Electrical and Electronics Engineers (IEEE) in 2012 for his contributions to waveguide optical nonreciprocal devices for optical communications.

References

Fellow Members of the IEEE
Living people
Japanese electrical engineers
Year of birth missing (living people)
Place of birth missing (living people)
Academic staff of Tokyo Institute of Technology